Pachyceras is a genus of perisphinctoid ammonites from the Middle Jurassic, upper Callovian stage, and is the type genus for the family Pachyceratidae.  The shell is involute, subglobular, with a deep umbilicus and flattened flanks that slope toward a more narrowly rounded venter, and covered by low, widely spaced ribs.

Distribution
Jurassic deposits of Egypt, France, India, Saudi Arabia and Switzerland.

References

 D. T. Donovan, J. H. Callomon and M. K. Howarth 1981.  Classification of the Jurassic Ammonitina; The Ammonoidea. The Systematics Association special volume no. 18

Jurassic ammonites
Perisphinctoidea
Ammonitida genera
Ammonites of Europe
Callovian life